Horseshoes & Handgrenades is the eighth album from Christian metal group Disciple. The album was physically released on September 14, 2010, and digitally available from July 22, 2010 through their website. The first song they recorded for the album was "The Ballad of St. Augustine". The album debuted at No. 50 on the Billboard 200. This is the first album to feature guitarist Andrew Welch, guitarist Micah Sannan, bassist Israel Beachy, and drummer Trent Reiff.

Track listing

Awards
The album won a Dove Award for Rock Album of the Year at the 42nd GMA Dove Awards, while the song "Dear X (You Don't Own Me)" was nominated for Rock Recorded Song of the Year.

References

2010 albums
Disciple (band) albums
INO Records albums